Roxanne Allison "Roxie" Agnaonao Baeyens (born March 16, 1997), also known by her talent screen name Roxie Smith,  is a Filipino-Belgian actress, model and beauty pageant titleholder who was crowned Miss Philippines Earth 2020. She is the first Miss Philippines Earth to win the title via virtual contest.
 Previously, she won the national search of the Face of Tourism Philippines 2019 pageant.

As a commercial model, she has appeared in TV commercials such as Jack 'n jill, Axe, Nescafé among others.

Early life and education 
Baeyens was born and raised in Baguio, Philippines. Her mother, Julia  Agnaonao is a real estate broker and environmentalist from Catengan, Besao, Mountain Province and her father, Walter Baeyens was an information technology specialist from Brussels, Belgium. She is the youngest of three siblings. Her older sister, Michelle lives in Belgium while her brother Jeff Anthony is a mechanical engineer based in Subic.

She studied at Baguio City National High School and finished her college education at Saint Louis University with a degree in Tourism Management.

She is a commercial model in the Philippines and signed up as an artist with Cornerstone Entertainment Inc, that also handles the career of Catriona Gray, Jason Dy, Jay R, Erik Santos and Jaya as talents. Post pageantry, Baeyens has pursued acting under the screen name Roxie Smith. She is part of the Sparkada, a group of 17 young and talented artists of this generation of Sparkle—the talent management arm of GMA Network.

Pageantry

Face of Tourism Philippines 

Baeyens competed and won the crown of the Face of Tourism Philippines 2019 pageant held at SMX Convention Center Manila at the Mall of Asia in Pasay City, Philippines on April 7, 2019. She also bagged major awards which included: Face of Wellness, Face of Elegance, and Face of Festivity.

In the final question and answer category, she was asked the question: "Why should you be the next Face of Tourism Philippines 2019" She answered:As a tourism graduate, I’ve learned one important thing. The best way to find yourself is to lose in the service of others. If I were to gain the crown tonight, I will encourage others to be like me not only to help the environment, contribute to the economy of the Philippines but teach them even with the small act of goodness, it could lead to something big; that’s what makes a winner and that’s the life I want to lead. God is happy if He will give us a gift. But God would be happier if we would be the answer to somebody else’s prayer.”

She represented the Philippines in the international competition, Miss Tourism & Culture Universe in Myanmar in September 2019, where she won first runner-up.

Miss Philippines Earth 2020
Baeyens represented Baguio in the national Miss Philippines Earth 2020 pageant with the final coronation held on July 5, 2020 She defeated 33 other candidates and were judged for their fitness and form, beauty of face, and intelligence and environmental awareness. She won the top title, Miss Philippines Earth 2020 during the pageant's first virtual coronation edition due to  quarantine restrictions from the COVID-19 pandemic in its 20-year history which was on live telecast on GMA Network. She succeeded and was crowned by Miss Philippines Earth 2019 Janelle Tee during pageant finals. She also won four special awards: Darling of the Press and the Eco-Video award,  Beauty of Face, Best Covid Craze outfit.

As part of the pageant's advocacy, Baeyens advocates urban gardening to encourage people to plant in their homes and business areas.

In the final question and answer round, the top five contestants were asked the same question: "What important quality should a leader display amidst a pandemic?" She answered:A leader should display having a green thumb because at this point in time we have a shortage in food supply so it's important to open the eyes of people to embrace having a sustainable life to start urban agriculture at their own homes, after all, a green life is a better life and I hope the leader will give that to us.”

Media and environmental activism
In an interview with Rappler on why she joined Miss Philippines Earth, she said: "I want to be the Miss Philippines Earth 2020 because all my life, I was a witness of my mom being an environmentalist and I wanted to continue the legacy in my family and be the change I want to see in the world". Her pageant environmental advocacies are urban gardening, promote animal welfare, and HIV/AIDS awareness. She spearheaded a feeding drive called the STRAY-t From the Heart to feed several dogs and cats left on the streets. Baeyens was interviewed by CNN on July 6, 2020, and encouraged Filipinos to plant their own food in their backyard to improve the Philippines's food supply amidst the COVID-19 pandemic.

In September 2020, she led the launching of the "Baguio Urban Garden Hopping" program to promote urban organic gardens and fishponds in Baguio and to educate people to become urban farmers which was spearheaded by the City Veterinary and Agriculture Office in partnership with the Philippine Department of Agriculture and Bureau of Fisheries and Aquatic Resources.

She collaborated with the Philippine Department of Agriculture's project “Plant, Plant, Plant” to promote the program in the Cordillera Administrative Region as part of the national greening program of the Philippines Department of Environment and Natural Resources.

In November 2020, she launched the fundraising event “Live Selling for a Cause” to help the victims in Cagayan of Category 4-equivalent Typhoon Ulysses that struck the Philippines and Vietnam.

After winning Miss Earth Water 2020, Baeyens continued her collaboration with the Philippine Department of Agriculture for “ASPIRE” project which targets for a food secure Philippines with farmers and fisherfolk. She attended the launching of the project as Keynote Speaker.

She is the current national director of Miss Bikini Philippines.

References

External links

1997 births
Living people
Miss Philippines Earth winners
Miss Earth 2020 contestants
People from Baguio
21st-century Filipino actresses
Filipino people of Belgian descent
Filipino models